The Atzelberg is a mountain of the Taunus near Eppenhain, constituent community of Kelkheim, Hesse, Germany. Its silhouette is remarkable for a Typenturm radio tower. It is part of the natural region High Taunus although being part of the Main-Taunus-Kreis as well.

Hills of Hesse
Mountains and hills of the Taunus
High Taunus